"Fix Me" is the second single from the 2010 album Feeding the Wolves, released by alternative metal band 10 Years.

Music video

On June 17 and 18, the band shot a music video for "Fix Me" in Columbus, Ohio with production company Thunder Down Country. The video was released via YouTube on August 9, 2011.
The video depicts the band in a karaoke bar playing as various different characters. As the video continues, the characters get into a fight with one another.

Charts

References 

10 Years (band) songs
Songs written by Dave Bassett (songwriter)
Songs written by Jesse Hasek
Universal Republic Records singles
Song recordings produced by Howard Benson
2011 singles
2011 songs